Arnela Šabanović (born 16 June 1991) is a Bosnian-Herzegovinian football goalkeeper, currently playing for SFK 2000 Sarajevo in the Bosnia and Herzegovina Women's Premier League.
She is a member of the Bosnia and Herzegovina women's national football team.

Career 

Šabanović plays as a goalkeeper for Bosnian Women's Premier club SFK 2000 since July 2017, with which she played in the first round of the UEFA Women's Champions League. She is a member of the Women National football team of BiH since 2013. She also played for FC Čelik from Zenica, FC Mladost from Nević Polje.

Personal life
Šabanović lives in Zenica.

Arnela's father, who was a goalkeeper and defended the colours of the club during his education in Brac had a great influence on her sporting activities.

References 

Bosnia and Herzegovina women's footballers
1991 births
Living people
Women's association football goalkeepers
Sportspeople from Zenica
Bosnia and Herzegovina women's international footballers